Nitrincola lacisaponensis is a gram-negative, non-spore-forming and motile bacterium from the genus of Nitrincola which has been isolated from decomposing wood from the Soap Lake from Grant County in the United States.

References

Oceanospirillales
Bacteria described in 2005